The Black Autonomy Network Community Organization (BANCO) is a political and social justice coalition working in Benton Harbor, Michigan, US.  It was founded by Edward Pinkney to protest the June 16, 2003 death of a 28-year-old African-American, Terrance Shurn, while being pursued by Benton Township police. A riot followed the death, as accounts differed   as to whether Shurn had lost control of his motorcycle or had been forced off the road by police.

BANCO organized rallies in the days following Shurn's death and the resulting disturbance.  It has since broadened its scope to support candidates for local office. BANCO retains its focus on monitoring police activities.

In September 2004, BANCO announced it had purchased facilities to open a textile plant in Benton Harbor.  The cloth-cutting operation was intended to alleviate poverty by offering local employment opportunities. The plant has yet to open as of January 2015.

BANCO reportedly attempts to continue the work of the American civil rights movement.

Founder Edward Pinkney 
In February 2005, BANCO founder Edward Pinkney organized a recall election of city commissioner Glenn Yarborough. Pinkney, a resident of neighboring Benton Township (not of the city of Benton Harbor) and therefore unable to vote in the election himself, was charged with voter fraud, allegedly paying Benton Harbor residents to vote to oust Yarborough. Charges involved illegal possession and distribution of absentee ballots, illegal voter registration of people not living in the city, and payment for votes. In a second recall election in August 2005, city voters retained Yarborough as at-large city commissioner.

On March 27, 2006, a Berrien County jury was unable to come to a consensus verdict in Pinkney's felony election fraud case. A mistrial was declared. County officials decided to retry Pinkney on March 29, 2006.

On March 22, 2007, a Berrien County jury convicted Pinkney of five counts. He was sentenced to probation, but was jailed for violating probation in 2008.

In 2009, Pinkney co-founded the National Association for the Advancement of Colored People (NAACP)'s Benton Harbor, Michigan chapter and was elected its president.

In November 2014, Pinkney was convicted of felony forgery charges in Michigan. In December 2014, Edward Pinkney was sentenced to 2½ to 10 years in prison. Pinkney maintains his innocence.

References

Further reading
Pinkney, Edward.  Whirlpool has sucked the life out of Benton Harbor. Retrieved August 12, 2005.

External links
BANCO The Black Autonomy Network Community Organization

Black Autonomy Network Community Organization